NEXT for AUTISM is a non-profit organization founded in 2003 to address the needs of autistic people and their families. The organization was founded by Laura and Harry Slatkin and Ilene Lainer, none of whom outwardly identify as autistic, making this a non-autistic-led organization. One of NEXT for AUTISM's most well known accomplishments was opening the first charter school in New York to exclusively serve autistic students.

Every two years, NEXT for AUTISM partners with Comedy Central to produce an autism benefit called "Night of Too Many Stars". The event features performances from various comedians frequently including Jon Stewart, Conan O'Brien, Tina Fey, Amy Poehler, and George Clooney.

The organization also founded Project SEARCH Collaborates for Autism, a program to help autistic high school students transition from school to work. In June 2013, they opened the Center for Autism and the Developing Brain on the New York-Presbyterian Westchester campus to provide clinical services to autistic people throughout their lives.

The organization began as the New York Center for Autism, then changed its name to New York Collaborates for Autism in 2012. It has since changed its name to NEXT for AUTISM.

In April 2021, Mark Rober and Jimmy Kimmel announced they would be hosting a live stream in support of NEXT for AUTISM. As of May 1, they have raised over $3 million.

The organization has received criticism for its endorsement of Autism Speaks and applied behavior analysis.

References

External links 
 

Autism-related organizations in the United States
Mental health organizations in New York (state)
2003 establishments in New York City
Organizations established in 2003